Kang Sehwang (1713–1791) was a high government official but also a representative painter, calligrapher and art critic of the mid Joseon period. He was born in Jinju, Gyeongsangnam-do, the son of Kang Hyeon. He entered royal service at over sixty years old. Kang pursued and established muninhwa ("paintings by people of culture", referring to the Korean seonbi or literati upper-class) with his own creativity. He helped to develop the 'true view' style of painting and was a teacher of Kim Hongdo.

Gallery

See also
Korean painting
List of Korean painters
Korean art
Korean culture

References

External links

Brief biography of Kang Sehwang and gallery (in Korean)
Brief biography of Kang Sehwang (in Korean)
 Arts of Korea, an exhibition catalog from The Metropolitan Museum of Art Libraries (fully available online as PDF), which contains material on Gang Sehwang 

1713 births
1791 deaths
18th-century Korean painters
18th-century Korean calligraphers